The Interstate Highways in Massachusetts comprise five current primary Interstate Highways and eight auxiliary Interstates. In addition, two auxiliary Interstates were proposed and then cancelled.

The longest Interstate Highway in Massachusetts is I-90 with 136 miles, followed by I-495 with 121 miles.

Several freeway projects in the Boston area planned as part of the Interstate Highway System were cancelled in the 1970s following community opposition, including the Inner Belt (I-695) and Southwest Expressway (I-95). The Big Dig megaproject in the 1990s and 2000s, which realigned several highways in Downtown Boston, included a new tunnel for I-93 to replace the Central Artery and an extension of I-90 via the Ted Williams Tunnel.



Primary Interstate Highways

Auxiliary Interstate Highways

See also

References

 
Interstate